Little Tallapoosa River is a  river in Georgia and Alabama, in the United States. It rises in northern Carroll County, Georgia near the city of Villa Rica and flows southwest into Alabama, joining the Tallapoosa River in Randolph County near the head of R.L. Harris Reservoir.

In May 2012, Aimee Copeland, a 24-year-old graduate student fell from a zip-line into the Little Tallapoosa River. She suffered a deep cut in her leg and contracted necrotizing fasciitis, a flesh-eating bacterial disease. She was forced to have her leg amputated a week after the accident.

References

Rivers of Alabama
Bodies of water of Randolph County, Alabama
Rivers of Georgia (U.S. state)
Rivers of Carroll County, Georgia
Alabama placenames of Native American origin
Georgia placenames of Native American origin